Damian Robert Chapa (born October 29, 1963) is an American actor, film director, and producer.

Life
Chapa's ancestry is of Mexican, Italian, German and Native American descent. He now calls San Antonio, Texas home.

Career
Chapa played the part of evangelist Leroy Jenkins in the 2002 film The Calling. Perhaps his most notable film role is that of Miklo Velka in Taylor Hackford's Blood In Blood Out. He appeared as Ken Masters in Raúl Juliá's final film Street Fighter, based on the video game Street Fighter II: The World Warrior.

Legal history 
In 2011 Damian Chapa was arrested in Madrid and later transferred to a Munich jail to await a court appearance on a charge of the alleged rape of former girlfriend Roxanna Foell. He was subsequently released and exonerated and paid several thousand euros by the German government in September 2011 after being held in custody wrongfully for seven weeks. Chapa has apparently since filed a $1.3 million lawsuit for damages against Foell.

Filmography

References

External links 

American male film actors
American male television actors
American film directors
American film directors of Mexican descent
Hispanic and Latino American male actors
Living people
American male actors of Mexican descent
American film producers
1963 births
American people of Italian descent
Male actors from Dayton, Ohio